Ian Holt (born April 1, 1982) is an American track and road racing cyclist. He rode in the points race the 2016 UCI Track Cycling World Championships. Holt is a major in the United States Air Force and is in the world class athlete program.

References

External links
 
 
 

1982 births
Living people
American male cyclists
United States Air Force Athlete of the Year